Shirg may refer to several places in Iran:

 Shirag
Shirk-e Sorjeh